Anacleoniceras is an extinct genus of cephalopod belonging to the Ammonite subclass.

References

Early Cretaceous ammonites